United Nations General Assembly Resolution 73/194 was adopted on December 17, 2018 by the Seventy-third session of the United Nations General Assembly in response to the Russian activities in Crimea as well as the Kerch Strait incident. The non-binding resolution, which was supported by 66 United Nations member states, affirmed the General Assembly's commitment to the territorial integrity of Ukraine within its internationally recognized borders and condemns the Kerch Strait incident. Nineteen nations voted against the resolution, while 72 abstained, and a further 36 states were absent when the vote took place.

Voting

Draft Amendment 
Before action on the initial draft, the Islamic Republic of Iran and the Syrian Arab Republic proposed an amendment calling upon both parties to cooperate on resolving the crisis. The Amendment failed with only 25 votes in favor.

References

2018 in the United Nations
2018 in law
Annexation of Crimea by the Russian Federation
United Nations General Assembly resolutions
2018 in Ukraine
2018 in Russia
Russia and the United Nations
Ukraine and the United Nations